Expeditie Robinson 2011 is the thirteenth season of the RTL5 and 2BE reality television series Expeditie Robinson first aired on September 1, 2011. It was the third season hosted by Evi Hanssen and Eddy Zoëy.

This season also includes celebrities only, similar to Expeditie Robinson 2010.

Survivors

 Kamp Noord
 Kamp Zuid 
 Visserseiland
 Winnaarseiland
 Afvallersgrot

 Originally, Tanja received one black vote at the twelfth council, but undid the vote by one immunity coin.

 Originally, Jochem received three votes at the fifth council and four votes at the twelfth council, but undid two votes by two immunity coins.
 
 Originally, Lauretta received one vote at the first council and two votes at the extra third council, but undid the votes by three immunity coins.

 Originally, Anne received eight votes at the tenth council, but undid one vote by one immunity coin.

 Originally, Deborah received three votes at the fifth council, but undid one vote by one immunity coin.

 Freddy voluntarily quit, before going to the Afvallersgrot, at the third council, where he was voted off. Due to his decision an extra council was introduced in Episode 3.

 Originally, Sipke Jan received six votes at the first council, but undid two votes by two immunity coins.

Future Appearances
Dominique "Do" van Hulst returned to compete in Expeditie Robinson 2021.

External links
 Official website Expeditie Robinson at RTL5
 Official website Expeditie Robinson at 2BE
 

Dutch reality television series
Expeditie Robinson seasons
2011 Dutch television seasons
2011 Belgian television seasons
Belgian reality television series